More Bloody Meetings is a 1984 British comedy training film that stars John Cleese as a bumbling middle manager. The film was directed by Charles Crichton and written by Antony Jay. It was produced by Cleese's production company Video Arts.

External links 

1984 films
1984 comedy films
1980s business films
1980s educational films
British comedy films
Films directed by Charles Crichton
Films with screenplays by Antony Jay
1980s English-language films
1980s British films
British educational films